Gun Smoke is a 1936 American Western film, directed by Bartlett Carré. It stars Buck Coburn, Marion Shilling, and Bud Osborne, and was released in January 1936.

Cast list
 Buck Coburn as Steve Branning
 Marion Shilling as Jean Culverson
 Bud Osborne as Haws McGee
 Ben Corbett as Shorty
 Henry Hall as George Culverson
 Roger Williams as Sam Parsons
 Dick Botiller as Felipe
 Nelson McDowell as Long Distance Jones
 Lloyd Ingraham as Eli Parker
 Tracy Layne as Pecos
 Philo McCullough as Abner Sneed
 Lafe McKee as Sheriff
 Phyllis Barrington as 	Mrs. Parker in Photo

References

External links 
 
 
 

1936 Western (genre) films
1936 films
American Western (genre) films
American black-and-white films
1930s American films